Zhongyuan station is a station on the Taipei Metro's Circular line. The station was opened on 31 January 2020. It is located in Zhonghe District, New Taipei, Taiwan.

Station layout

Around the station
 MIT International Science Park (100m east of the station)
 MSI Technology (400m east of the station)
 Guangzhi Park (850m northeast of the station)
 Yuanshan Park (1.1km southwest of the station)
 Global Mall Zhonghe Store (1.3km southwest of the station)
 Min Xiang Market (1.7km southwest of the station)

Gallery

References

Zhonghe District
Circular line stations (Taipei Metro)
Railway stations opened in 2020
2020 establishments in Taiwan